Rigedan (also Romanized as Rīgedān; also known as Regedān) is a village in Jahliyan Rural District, in the Central District of Konarak County, Sistan and Baluchestan Province, Iran. At the 2006 census, its population was 31, in 6 families.

References 

Populated places in Konarak County